Albert Tessier ((); March 6, 1895 – September 13, 1976) was a French-speaking Canadian priest, historian and a film maker.

He was born on in Sainte-Anne-de-la-Pérade, Mauricie.

Life as a Priest and Educator 

He was ordained priest by Monsignor François-Xavier Cloutier in June 1920 and received a PhD in Theology in Rome in 1922.  He moved back to his native area in 1924 and began a career as a teacher and professor of history and literature.  In 1937, he replaced Thomas Chapais and took over the Chair in History of Canada at the Université Laval.

Promoting Local Identity 

Tessier was known to be very proud of his area of origin. He coined the word Mauricie in 1933 to designate his native area. Before then, the expression "Saint-Maurice Valley" had been used. Many of the movies that he produced informed the public about the area's background.

Filmography 
From 1925 until his death, Tessier made more than seventy non-fiction films. His favorite subjects were nature, history, religion, education and culture.

Death 
Albert Tessier died at the Saint-Joseph Hospital in Trois-Rivières on September 13, 1976.

Legacy 

The following were named in Tessier's honor:

The Prix Albert-Tessier award;
Avenue Albert-Tessier, located in Shawinigan, Quebec.
Pavillon Albert-Tessier, located at Université du Québec à Trois-Rivières

External links
Biographie
Fonds Albert-Tessier from Cégep de Trois-Rivières
L'Agora
Bilan de l'Université de Sherbrooke

1895 births
1976 deaths
Abbés
Canadian male non-fiction writers
20th-century Canadian Roman Catholic priests
Film directors from Quebec
Historians from Quebec
20th-century Canadian historians